Let the Right One In  is a 2004 vampire novel by Swedish writer John Ajvide Lindqvist. The story centers on the relationship between a 12-year-old boy, Oskar, and a centuries-old vampire child, Eli. It takes place in Blackeberg, a working-class suburb of Stockholm, in the early 1980s. The book grapples with the darker side of humanity, including such issues as existential anxiety, social isolation, fatherlessness, divorce, alcoholism, school bullying, pedophilia, genital mutilation, self-mutilation, and murder.

The book was a bestseller in the author's home country of Sweden; it was translated into several languages, including English.

It has been adapted as two independent films, a play, and a television series. A Swedish-language film, Let the Right One In, directed by Tomas Alfredson, was released in 2008. Another adaptation was created in English and based on Lindqvist's screenplay. Entitled Let Me In, it was directed by Matt Reeves and released in 2010. An English-language stage adaptation premiered in 2013.

American network TNT ordered a pilot episode for a television series based on the novel, to premiere in 2017. TNT ultimately passed on the series. In 2021, Showtime gave the Let the Right One In series a 10-episode order, to be produced by Tomorrow Studios and starring Demián Bichir. The series premiered on October 9, 2022.

Synopsis

In 1981 Blackeberg, Stockholm, Oskar is a 12-year-old boy who is on the verge of his 13th birthday. He lives with his mother, who is loving and with whom he initially seems to have a close connection. His father, whom Oskar visits occasionally, is an alcoholic living in the countryside. A victim of merciless bullying, Oskar has gained morbid interests, which include crime and forensics. He keeps a scrapbook filled with newspaper articles about various murders and often fantasizes about killing his tormentors. He even goes as far as taking out his aggression on a tree in the woods near his apartment.

One day, Oskar befriends Eli, a girl who just moved in next door and claims to be the same age. Eli lives with an older man named Håkan, a former teacher who was fired when caught in possession of child pornography. Later in the novel, she's revealed to be a vampire who was turned as a child and is stuck forever in a young body and mind. Oskar and Eli develop a close relationship, and she helps him fight back against his tormentors. Throughout the book their relationship gradually becomes closer, and they reveal more of themselves, including fragments of Eli's human life. Among the details revealed is that Eli is a boy named Elias who was castrated when he was turned into a vampire over 200 years ago. He dresses in female clothing and is perceived by outsiders as a young girl.

Håkan serves Eli, whom he loves, by procuring blood from the living. He struggles with his conscience and chooses victims whom he can physically trap, but who are not too young. Eli pays him for doing this. Håkan offers to go out one last time if he can spend a night with Eli after he gets the blood. Eli says that Håkan may only touch him.

Håkan's last attempt to get blood fails, and he's caught. Just before capture, he intentionally disfigures himself with acid so that the police will not be able to trace Eli through him. When Eli finds him in the hospital, Håkan offers his blood. Eli drinks his blood but a guard interrupts them and Eli fails to kill him. To avoid becoming a vampire, Håkan throws himself out the window to the ground below. Despite this, he is reanimated as a mindless vampire driven by his desire for Eli. Håkan relentlessly pursues Eli, trapping him in a basement where he tries to rape him. Eli fights him off and escapes. Later, the wounded Håkan is destroyed by Tommy who accidentally gets locked in the basement with him.

Meanwhile, Blackeberg local alcoholic Lacke suspects a child is responsible for the murder of his best friend, Jocke (whom Eli has killed for blood). Later, Lacke witnesses Eli attack his sometime girlfriend, Virginia. Eli tries to drink her blood, but Lacke fights him off. Virginia survives, but starts turning into a vampire.

She does not realize her "infection" until she tries to prolong her life by drinking her own blood, and finds that exposure to the sun causes boils on her skin. Upon being hospitalized, Virginia realizes her transformation and kills herself in bed by deliberately exposing herself to daylight. Attempting to avenge Virginia, Lacke is thwarted by Oskar and Eli.

Oskar eventually fights back and injures his tormentor, Jonny. Jimmy, the older brother, hunts down Oskar for retaliation. Oskar sets fire to the boys' desks, destroying a treasured photo album belonging to their father.

They corner Oskar at night at the local swimming pool and try to drown him. But, Eli rescues Oskar and beheads the two brothers. Eli and Oskar flee the city with Eli's money and possessions.

Characters

 Oskar, the male protagonist, a bullied twelve-year-old
 Eli, a centuries-old vampire who physically and mentally resembles a twelve-year-old
 Håkan, a middle-aged man who helps Eli by procuring blood
 Tommy, a rebellious teenager, neighbor and friend of Oskar
 Lacke, the local alcoholic
 Virginia, a divorced woman who has a difficult relationship with Lacke
 Yvonne, Tommy's mother
 Staffan, a policeman and Yvonne's new boyfriend
 Jonny, a bully in Oskar's class
 Jimmy, Jonny's older, sadistic brother
 Morgan, Jocke, Larry and Gösta, Lacke's friends

Title

The title refers to the Morrissey song "Let the Right One Slip In". It is a play on the concept in vampire folklore which says that vampires cannot enter a house unless invited. The American version is called Let Me In because the publishers believed that the original title was too long. They first suggested the title be changed to Let Her In, but Lindqvist suggested Let Me In instead, given that 'Her' was inaccurate. It is the vampire who must be careful to let the right person in on her secret. A paperback with the original title was later released to promote the film.

Bibliography (English translations)
UK Edition: London: Quercus: 2007. 
US Edition: Let The Right One In: New York: Thomas Dunne Books: 2007. 
Australian Edition: Melbourne: Text: 2007.

Epilogue
Lindqvist wrote a short story titled Låt de gamla drömmarna dö ("Let the Old Dreams Die"), exploring what happened to Oskar and Eli after they got off on the train. 

The story is told from the perspective of a friend of a couple consisting of Karin, a police officer who oversaw the investigation of the killings at the pool, and Stefan, the last person to see Oskar and Eli alive. Stefan saw Oskar and Eli after they had disembarked from the train on which they were riding in the epilogue. They were sitting on a trunk holding hands which they had cut to engage in the pact which Oskar had described to Eli previously, suggesting Oskar was intent on becoming a vampire along with Eli. The story concludes with new evidence that Oskar and Eli were recently in Barcelona, Spain.

Film adaptations

Let the Right One in (2008)

In 2008, a Swedish film adaptation of Let the Right One In was released, directed by Tomas Alfredson and starring Lina Leandersson as Eli and Kåre Hedebrant as Oskar. The film received critical acclaim and was voted the 94th greatest film since 2000 in an international critics' poll conducted by BBC.

Let me in (2010)

An English language film based mainly on the Swedish film's screenplay was released in October 2010. The film's setting was changed from Blackeberg to Los Alamos, New Mexico, and the main characters' names were changed to Owen and Abby. Directed by Cloverfield director Matt Reeves and starring Chloë Grace Moretz as Abby and Kodi Smit-McPhee as Owen, it received positive reviews despite not performing well at the box office.

Television series

In March 2015, A&E Studios confirmed the television series adaption of the novel. The series will air on A&E and is written by Jeff Davis and Brandon Boyce. In August 2016, TNT ordered a pilot. In September 2016, Kristine Froseth was cast as Eli in the pilot. In October 2016, Thomas Kretschmann and Benjamin Wadsworth were cast in the pilot. TNT decided not to produce the series, and it was shopped around.

In March 2021, Showtime ordered a pilot. Demián Bichir joined the cast and the pilot will be produced by Tomorrow Studios. In April 2021, Anika Noni Rose joined the cast in the pilot. Later that month, Grace Gummer joined the cast of the pilot. In June, Madison Taylor Baez was added to the cast to star as the vampire-daughter Eleanor; other actors are Kevin Carroll, Jacob Buster, and Ian Foreman. In September 2021, it was announced that Showtime had given the production a series order for a first season consisting of 10 episodes. In February 2022, Željko Ivanek and Fernanda Andrade joined the cast in recurring roles. The series is scheduled to premiere on October 9, 2022.

In an October 2022 interview John Ajvide Lindqvist mentioned he had nothing to do with the TV show and lamented inadvertently selling all rights to the book for only 1 SEK when he thought he was only giving Hammer Films the rights to make the movie (Let Me In), meaning he will earn no royalties from the TV show. According to Lindqvist, Hammer had misled him of the nature of the contract; “There were thick bundles of American legal prose. And that would then mean that I sold all the rights for a penny, but that was just a mere formality and would have no practical meaning, they said.”

Stage adaptations

Lindqvist
An adaptation directed by Jakob Hultcrantz Hansson with a script by John Ajvide Lindqvist premiered March 16, 2011 on Uppsala Stadsteater, Uppsala. It premiered at Nord-Trøndelag Teater in Steinkjer, Norway on November 15, 2012.

Thorne 

A new stage adaptation produced by Marla Rubin and the National Theatre of Scotland written by Jack Thorne directed by John Tiffany premiered at Dundee Rep Theatre in June 2013 and transferred to the Royal Court Theatre for November & December 2013. The show transferred to the Apollo Theatre in March 2014, having received positive reviews from a number of national media outlets. The production toured to New York with a run at St. Ann's Warehouse in 2015. In January 2016, a production opened in Seoul, South Korea.  Jack Thorne's play premiered at Rogaland Teater in Stavanger, Norway, January 24, 2015 in a new production as La den rette komme inn.

Comic book series

In April 2010, Hammer Film Productions and Dark Horse Comics announced a four-issue comic book limited series with Marc Andreyko as the author. The series, titled Let Me In: Crossroads, is a prequel to the American film. The first issue has Abby and her "guardian" facing a ruthless real-estate tycoon who wants to steal their home and was released in December 2010.

Original author John Ajvide Lindqvist said, "Nobody has asked me about [doing a comic] and I think that the project stinks. I am looking into this matter and hope that they have no right to do this." Later, he told fans that he learned he had unwittingly sold the rights for the comic to be made. He said that the producers had misled him about the contract he had signed for the adaptation of his work.

References

2004 fantasy novels
2004 Swedish novels
Swedish horror novels
Swedish novels adapted into television shows
Novels about friendship
Novels by John Ajvide Lindqvist
Novels set in Stockholm
Novels set in the 1980s
Swedish novels adapted into films
Swedish novels adapted into plays
Vampire novels